Əngəlan (also Əngilan, Angelan, Angalan or Ангилан) is a village in the Khizi Rayon or Azerbaijan.  The village forms part of the municipality of Tıxlı.

Before the breakup of the Soviet Union, it was a village in Khizi Selsoviet under jurisdiction of the city of Sumqayit of Azerbaijan SSR,  from Khizi, the administrative center of the selsoviet. Two smaller villages: Ashaga Angelan ("Lower Angelan") and Yukhary Angelan ("Upper Angelan) appeared.

References

Populated places in Khizi District